This is a list of the Major Historical and Cultural Sites Protected at the National Level in the autonomous region of Tibet, the People's Republic of China.

 
  

  
 

 

  

  

  

  

|}

See also
 Principles for the Conservation of Heritage Sites in China
 Sinicization of Tibet

References

 
Tibet
Tibet-related lists